State Route 264 (SR 264) is a relatively short north–south highway in Middle Tennessee. The road begins  NE of Dowelltown and ends in Elmwood.

Route description 

It immediately passes down a hill and through the small community of Temperance Hall. After leaving Temperance Hall, SR 264 travels roughly northward and enters Smith County. During its time in DeKalb County, SR 264 is known as Hickman Highway.

After entering Smith County, SR 264 becomes Temperance Hall Highway, passing through Hickman. North of Hickman, the highway is once again known as Hickman Highway into Gordonsville. Upon entering Gordonsville, the old alignment of Hickman Highway splits off and continues north into town, while SR 264 turns northwest along a two-lane bypass known as Hatton Waterford Parkway. This bypass intersects SR 53 and SR 141 at a four-way stop, at which point SR 264 begins a concurrency with SR 141. They travel east as Main Street through Gordonsville before SR 264 splits off and continues northeast.

At this point SR 264 is known as Stonewall Highway as it crosses the Caney Fork River and moves through the community of Stonewall. In Stonewall, SR 264 curves to the north and continues to its northern terminus at US 70N/SR 24/SR 53 in Elmwood.

Major intersections

See also 
List of state routes in Tennessee

References 

264
Transportation in DeKalb County, Tennessee
Transportation in Smith County, Tennessee